Elaine Hugh-Jones (14 June 1927 – 29 March 2021) was a Welsh pianist, music educator and composer. She was born in London and studied piano with Harold Craxton, Julian Isserlis and with Lennox Berkeley. After completing her studies, she took a position as an accompanist with the BBC, where she worked for 37 years. She also taught music at Malvern Girls' College.

Works
Selected works include:
A back view (in Eight Cornford Songs) (Text: Frances Cornford)
Bicker's Cottage (in Eight Cornford Songs) (Text: Frances Cornford)
Echo (in Six de la Mare Songs) (Text: Walter de la Mare)
Ghosts (in Six de la Mare Songs) (Text: Walter de la Mare)
Night song (in Eight Cornford Songs) (Text: Frances Cornford)
Silver (in Six de la Mare Songs) (Text: Walter de la Mare)
The hare (in Six de la Mare Songs) (Text: Walter de la Mare)
The madman and the child (in Eight Cornford Songs) (Text: Frances Cornford)
The old woman at the flower show (in Eight Cornford Songs) (Text: Frances Cornford)
The ride‑by‑nights (in Six de la Mare Songs) (Text: Walter de la Mare)
The road to Coursegoules (in Eight Cornford Songs) (Text: Frances Cornford)
The watch (in Eight Cornford Songs) (Text: Frances Cornford)
To a young cat in the orchard (in Eight Cornford Songs) (Text: Frances Cornford)
Winter (in Six de la Mare Songs) (Text: Walter de la Mare)

Hugh-Jones' songs were broadcast on BBC Radio 3 and have been recorded and released on CD, including:
Poésie et musique au féminin (The Feminine in Poetry and Music) Audio CD (9 April 2002) Gallo, ASIN: B000063COE
In Flanders Fields Audio CD (9 May 2006) Quartz, ASIN: B000E1P33Y

She has also been featured in British Music: Some Views of Richard Arnell; Bantock & Newman; Holst, Purcell & Morley College; Elaine Hugh - Jones; Tobias Matthay; Music in Birmingham: v. 29 by Paul Jackson and Roger Carpenter (Paperback - 31 Oct 2007) British Music Society,

References

1927 births
20th-century classical composers
21st-century classical composers
British music educators
Women classical composers
2021 deaths
Welsh classical composers
Welsh classical pianists
Welsh women pianists
20th-century British composers
21st-century classical pianists
Women music educators
20th-century women composers
21st-century women composers
Musicians from London
20th-century women pianists
21st-century women pianists